The men's lightweight (60 kg/118.8 lbs) Low-Kick division at the W.A.K.O. European Championships 2004 in Budva was the fourth lightest of the male Low-Kick tournaments and involved just four fighters.  Each of the matches was three rounds of two minutes each and were fought under Low-Kick kickboxing rules.

The tournament champion was Artur Tozliyan from Russia who defeated Poland's Michal Tomczykowski in the final by unanimous decision to win gold.  The tournaments only two other fighters, Bulgarian Tihomir Iliev and Italian Mario Donnarumma, won bronze medals.

Results
These matches ended in a unanimous decision.

See also
List of WAKO Amateur European Championships
List of WAKO Amateur World Championships
List of male kickboxers

References

External links
 WAKO World Association of Kickboxing Organizations Official Site

W.A.K.O. European Championships 2004 (Budva)